Baptist is an unincorporated community in Wolfe County, Kentucky, United States.

History
The community was settled in the early nineteenth century and the Stillwater Baptist Church, from which the name was taken, was organized in 1837.
The Baptist post office opened in 1917 and closed in 1974.

References

Unincorporated communities in Wolfe County, Kentucky
Unincorporated communities in Kentucky